This is a list of the National Register of Historic Places listings in Nacogdoches County, Texas.

This is intended to be a complete list of properties and districts listed on the National Register of Historic Places in Nacogdoches County, Texas. There are five districts and 18 individual properties listed on the National Register in the county. Seven individually listed properties are Recorded Texas Historic Landmarks including two that are also State Antiquities Landmarks while several more Recorded Texas Historic Landmarks are included in the various districts.

Current listings

The publicly disclosed locations of National Register properties and districts may be seen in a mapping service provided.

|}

See also

National Register of Historic Places listings in Texas
Recorded Texas Historic Landmarks in Nacogdoches County

References

External links

Registered Historic Places
Nacogdoches County